A lighthouse museum is a museum specializing in the display of historical objects relating to lighthouses. These museums are either stand alone buildings or are present in lighthouses that are active or inactive. Objects displayed include tools lighthouse keepers used at the time in their everyday lives to maintain the light as well as historic objects such as the Fresnel lens. In addition to navigation, lighthouses in general continue to operate almost as "small maritime museums".

Lighthouse museums 

The following is a list of lighthouse museums that are located worldwide. All of these entries are located on lighthouse property which may or may not be privately run, these areas include the lighthouse tower, keepers residence, and other buildings that were built to aid. The entries on this list include reliable sources that must mention a "lighthouse museum" on the given property.

Museums not in lighthouses 
 National Lighthouse Museum – New York, USA
 National Lighthouse Museum, South Korea – South Korea
 North Carolina Maritime Museum – North Carolina, USA

See also 
 Open-air museum

Note 
A. The opening date refers to the current museum.

References 

Lighthouses
Lighthouse museums
Types of museums
Lighthouses